Anil Kumar Gupta is a scientist and researcher from India who serves as a Professor in the Department of Geology and Geophysics at the Indian Institute of Technology Kharagpur. He was also the former Director (2010–2017) of the Wadia Institute of Himalayan Geology, Dehradun, India. His teaching interests include applied micropaleontology, paleoceanography and marine geosciences.

With a focus on the Indian monsoon, Gupta has made contributions to the fields of micropaleontology, paleoclimatology, and paleoceanography with special reference to the Indian monsoon system. He carried the publication of Inventory of Glacial Lakes of Uttarakhand. More than 176 of his articles in high-impact journals have been published in journals like Nature, Science, Nature Geoscience, Scientific Reports, Geology, Geophysical Research Letters, and Palaeo3 . In order to understand the history of Indian monsoon variability as well as oceanic changes in the Indian Ocean, Gupta has a long history of scientific acumen and research nuances. He has studied benthic and planktic foraminifera as well as their stable isotopes from Ocean Drilling Program (ODP) cores. At time scales ranging from decadal to millennial and orbital, he has made contributions to the knowledge of the past behavior of the Indian monsoon system and ocean circulation. His research includes the first description of the Indian Ocean Dipole in a paleo record and the documentation of Bond cycles in the paleo record of the Indian monsoon over the Holocene.

To understand precipitation variations in the region, Gupta has initiated new research projects on lake deposits and cave carbonates (speleothems) from different parts of the Indian landmass. He has produced the longest speleothem record from India that documents important shifts in the intensity of the Indian monsoon for the first time. At the Indian Institute of Technology in Kharagpur, he created laboratories that meet international standards and had the equipment necessary to do high resolution paleo-monsoonal research utilizing marine sediments, lake deposits, cave carbonates. Prof. Gupta has mentored 20 Ph.D. students.

Early life and career

Gupta was born in Budaun district of Uttar Pradesh in 1960. In 1980 he completed his Bachelor of Science with Honors (B.Sc. [Hons]) from Aligarh Muslim University, and in 1982 he pursued Master of Science (M.Sc.) from Banaras Hindu University.

Since 2003, Gupta has been working as a Professor in the Department of Geology and Geophysics at the Indian Institute of Technology (IIT) Kharagpur. Prior to that, he worked as a lecturer (1987–1990), Assistant Professor (1990–1999), and Associate Professor (1999–2003) in the same institution. He was also the department's head during 2006-2009. In 2010, he became the director of the Wadia Institute of Himalayan Geology, Dehradun, and served it for seven years.

From 1982 to 1987, he was a research fellow at the Banaras Hindu University. In 1990, he visited Louisiana State University, Baton Rouge, USA, for a year to do his post-doctoral research. Gupta also worked as a senior NRC, USA Research Scientist at National Oceanic and Atmospheric Administration (NOAA), Boulder, USA in 2001.

Honours and achievements

Gupta has received different awards. In 2010 he received TWAS Prize from the World Academy of Sciences, Trieste. In 2012, he was granted the “J.C. Bose National Fellowship” by the Department of Science and Technology (DST), New Delhi, India. The Indian Science Congress Association honored him with the “Young Scientist Award” in 1990 for his remarkable contribution to Indian scientific research. The National Research Council (NRC) of the United States of America awarded him a Senior Research Fellowship Award in 2001 to work at the National Oceanic and Atmospheric Administration (NOAA) Lab in Boulder, Colorado. In 1999, Gupta received Japan Society for the Promotion of Science (JSPS) Fellowship to work at Shimane University, Matsue, Japan.

His honors and achievements include:

 Received Prof. S. N. Bhalla Gold Medal, The Paleontological of India 2017
 Elected as Fellow of The World Academy of Sciences (TWAS) - academy of sciences for the developing world, 2012.
 Elected as Fellow of the Indian National Science Academy, New Delhi (FNA), 2012
 Awarded TWAS-2010 Prize of The World Academy of Sciences, Trieste, Italy, 2010
 Elected as Fellow of The Indian Academy of Sciences, Bangalore (FASc), India, 2008
 Elected as Fellow of The National Academy of Sciences, India (FNASc), 2006
 Conferred with Dr. J. Coggin Brown Memorial (Gold) Medal for Geological Sciences by the MGMI for 2005–2006
 Conferred with Prof. T. M. Harris Medal by Birbal Sahni Institute of Paleobotany, 2004
 Conferred National Mineral Award by the Ministry of Coal and Mines, New Delhi, India, 2000

Research

Gupta's work focuses on decadal to century and millennial scale changes in the South Asian/Indian monsoon and their teleconnection with climatic shifts in the North Atlantic based on proxy records from the Arabian Sea, Indian Himalaya and Ganga Basin. He and his team have made new insights in utilizing microfossil foraminifera from the Arabian Sea to identify both short- and long-term shifts in the South Asian/Indian monsoon during the Quaternary. His studies have made advances in linking Asian/Indian monsoon failures to societal collapses, human migrations and changes in agricultural practices in South Asia during the Holocene. His recent studies from the Himalayan and Ganga Basin lakes indicate a long arid phase during 4,350-2,900 years BP that led to the displacement of Indus settlements and a major change in agricultural practices including land use pattern. Furthermore, his studies foresee more extreme events in the Asian/Indian monsoon behavior in future as the Earth will warm owing to both natural forcing and human intervention. These research findings provide means to better perform climate modelling efforts.

Books and publications

Gupta is known for his research work that has societal impact. He has about 176 peer reviewed research papers in high impact factor journals including Nature, Science, Nature Geoscience, Nature Scientific Reports, Geology and Geophysical Research Letters, etc. He has published a book entitled "Neogene Deep Water Benthic Foraminifera from the Indian Ocean – A Monograph" on Nova publishers. Some of his notable publications are listed below:

 Anderson, D.M., Overpeck, J.T. and Gupta, A.K., 2002. Increase in the Asian southwest monsoon during the past four centuries. Science, 297(5581), pp. 596–599.
 Gupta, A.K., Anderson, D.M. and Overpeck, J.T., 2003. Abrupt changes in the Asian southwest monsoon during the Holocene and their links to the North Atlantic Ocean. Nature, 421(6921), pp. 354–357.
 Gupta, A.K., 2008. Monsoons, Quaternary. In: Vivian Gornitz (Ed.) Encyclopedia of Paleoclimatology and Ancient Environments, Springer, Berlin Heidelberg New York, pp. 589 – 594.
 Raj, M.S., De, S., Mohan, K. and Gupta, A.K., 2009. Benthic foraminifera Uvigerina proboscidea as a proxy for winter monsoon (late Pliocene to Recent): DSDP Site 219, northwestern Indian Ocean. In: Geoenvironment, Challenges Ahead, Bhat, G.M., Pandita, S.K., Singh, Y. and Lone, B.A. (Eds), MacMillan, New Delhi, 311-318.
 Quadir, D.A., Gupta, A.K., Phadtare, N.R., Shrestha, A.B., Chauhan, O.S., Kolli, R.K., Sheikh, M.M., Manzoor, N., Adnan, M., Ashraf, J., Khan, A.M., Chauhan, M.S., Meloth, T., Yadav, R.R., Chakravorty, S., Roy, P.D., and Devkota, L.P., 2009. Instrumental, terrestrial and marine records of the climate of South Asia during the Holocene: Present status, unresolved problems and societal aspects. In: Monsoon Asia: Integrated     Regional Studies (MAIRS) SCOPE/START Rapid Assessment, START, A.P. Mitra and C. Sharma (eds.), Chapter 3, p. 54-124.
 De, S., Sarkar, S. and Gupta, A.K., 2010. Orbital and suborbital variability in the equatorial Indian Ocean as recorded in sediments of the Maldives Ridge (ODP Hole 716A) during the past 444 ka. In: Clift, P.D., Tada, R. and Zheng, H. (Eds.), Monsoon Evolution and Tectonics – Climate Linage in Asia, Geological Society of London, Special Publications, v. 342, 17-27.
 Singh, V. S., Pandey, D.N., Gupta, A.K. and Ravindranath, N.H., 2010. Climate Change Impacts, Mitigation and Adaptation: Science for Generating Policy Options in Rajasthan, India. RSPCB Occasional Paper No. 2/2010, Rajasthan State Pollution Control Board, Jaipur, India, p. 1-150.
 Dobhal, D.P., Mehta, M., Kesarwani, K. and Gupta, A.K., 2014. Consequence of instability Processes triggered by heavy rainfall in Mandakini Valley, Central Himalaya, India. In: Rawat, U.S. and Semwal, V.P. (Eds.), Uttarakhand Disaster: Contemporary Issues of Climate Change and Development with Holistic Approach. Winsar Publishing Co., Dehradun, pp. 20–34.
 Bhambri, R., Mehta, M., Dobhal, D.P., and Gupta, A.K., 2015. Glacial Lake Inventory of Uttarakhand. Wadia Institute of Himalayan Geology, Dehradun, pp. 78.
 Mehta, M., Dobhal, D.P., Shukla, T. and Gupta, A.K., 2016. Instability Processes triggered by heavy rain in the Garhwal region, Uttarakhand, India. Climate Change, Glacier Response, and Vegetation Dynamics in the Himalaya, Chapter 12, p. 219-234.
 Jayankondam Perumal, R., Thakur, V.C., Joe Vivek, J., Rao, Priyanka Singh, Gupta, Anil Kumar, 2018. Active Tectonics of Kumaon and Garhwal Himalaya (Springer Natural Hazards). Springer; 1st ed. 2018 edition (April 16, 2018).
 Mehta, Manish, Bhambri, Rakesh, Perumal, J., Srivastava, Pradeep, and Gupta, Anil K., 2018. Uttarakhand Calamity: A Climate Revelation in the Bhagirathi River Valley Uttarakhand, India, Chapter, 10. In: I. Pal, R. Shaw (eds.), Disaster Risk Governance in India and Cross Cutting Issues, Disaster Risk Reduction.
 Dong, X., Kathayat, G., Rasmussen, S.O., Svensson, A., Severinghaus, J.P., Li, H., Sinha, A., Xu, Y., Zhang, H., Shi, Z. and Cai, Y., 2022. Coupled atmosphere-ice-ocean dynamics during Heinrich Stadial 2. Nature Communications, 13(1), pp. 1–14.
 Gupta, Anil K., 2022. Neogene Deep Water Benthic Foraminifera from the Indian Ocean – A Monograph.

References 

21st-century Indian geologists
Academic staff of IIT Kharagpur
Fellows of the Indian Academy of Sciences
Fellows of the Indian National Science Academy
Fellows of The National Academy of Sciences, India
1960 births
Living people